Nyota Ndogo (real name Mwanaisha Abdalla, born c. 1981) is a musician from Kenya who performs taarab-influenced pop music.

Ndogo is from the coastal city of Mombasa. She was a school drop-out who worked as a house maid. Her father Abdala Atib was a musician with a local band, but Nyota Ndogo did not take up musical career until being inspired by the hip hop group K-South's lyrics. She was discovered by Andrew Burchell, a Mombasa-based producer.

Nyota Ndogo has released four albums: Chereko, Nimetoka Mbali  Mpenzi and "Mama Wakambo", She won Kisima Award for best Taarab singer in 2003 and Best female singer in 2005. She has three nominations for the upcoming 2008 Kisima Awards. She was nominated for the Best Kenyan female artiste at the 2007 PAM Awards. Her song Watu na Viatu was nominated for the best East African song at the 2007 Tanzania Music Awards.

Her song "Take Care" is featured on the international World 2003 compilation album, while "Chereko" is on the Rough Guide to the Music of Kenya compilation, the same track was also featured on the Rough Guides - Off the Beaten Track compilation.

She has collaborated with Nonini on the track Nibebe  and with Necessary Noize on their track "Nataka Toa". She also did a collaborated with Ally B which was a hit in East Africa. Nyota Ndogo also did a collaboration with the famous Tanzanian Artist known as Q Chilla which was a success making  her do another collaboration with Mr Blue who is also a well known Tanzanian Artist. As a result of this collaboration she was among the nominees who were nominated to perform in Kilimanjaro Awards. In 2013 she also did another collaboration with Tember from Tanzania and Bobby Mapesa from Kenya a hit song called Nawachanganya.

Nyota has represented Kenya in various festivals in East Africa including Sauti za busara and Ziff in Zanzibar. She also represented Kenya in Comoros. Nyota has also performed in Dubai, Germany, and South Africa.  
The Mombasa song bird was employed and worked as a radio presenter in of the famous radio station known as Baraka Fm which is based in Mombasa, Kenya.
In 2013 she was among the judges in the biggest television show in East Africa called Tusker Project Fame.The same year she won Best Coast Female Artist of the Year 2013.
Her major song that hit the entire East Africa Airwaves was 'Watu Na Viatu'

On February 29, 2020 Nyota Ndogo published her hit song 'Je Wewe' in YouTube. The song was received with positive feedback from music lovers, her fans and radio stations.

She released a new single entitled "Mungu Wangu" in April 2021

References 

 TOTAL AWARDS     = 11

1981 births
Living people
21st-century Kenyan women singers